Federal Archives may refer to:

 German Federal Archives
 Federal Archives of Switzerland
 Leo J. Ryan Memorial Federal Archives and Records Center in the United States

See also List of national archives